The nineteenth season of British science fiction television series Doctor Who began on 4 January 1982 with Castrovalva, and ended with Time-Flight. John Nathan-Turner produced the series, with three script editors: Christopher H. Bidmead for the first story, Anthony Root for the next three and Eric Saward for the last three.

Casting

Main cast 
 Peter Davison as the Fifth Doctor
 Matthew Waterhouse as Adric
 Sarah Sutton as Nyssa
 Janet Fielding as Tegan Jovanka

Season 19 saw the introduction of Peter Davison as the Fifth Doctor. Tegan Jovanka (Janet Fielding), Nyssa (Sarah Sutton) and Adric (Matthew Waterhouse) were his companions. Adric is killed off in the climax of Earthshock; a rare instance in the series of a companion dying.

Recurring stars 
 Anthony Ainley as The Master

Anthony Ainley returns in Castrovalva and Time-Flight as the Master.

Guest stars
David Banks makes the first of four appearances in the show as a Cyber-leader beginning in Earthshock.

Serials 

Antony Root took over from Bidmead as script editor for Four to Doomsday and The Visitation, after which he was replaced by Eric Saward. The show moved from its traditional once-weekly Saturday broadcast to twice-weekly, primarily on Monday and Tuesday, although there were regional variations to the schedule.

Black Orchid was the first purely historical story, with no science-fiction elements save for the TARDIS and its crew, since The Highlanders from Season 4; it was also the first two-part serial since The Sontaran Experiment in Season 12, and the first of a regular run of a two-parter every season until the change of format to 45 minute episodes in Season 22.

Broadcast
The entire season was broadcast from 4 January to 30 March 1982. For the first time in the series' history, episodes were not broadcast on Saturdays, but in a twice weekly format on Mondays and Tuesdays.

Home media

VHS releases

DVD and Blu-ray releases

In print

References

Bibliography

 

1982 British television seasons
Season 19
Season 19
19